Mama Ametor Hoebuadzu II is the Paramount Queen of the Alavanyo Traditional Area in the Volta region of Ghana.

Private life 
She was born in Laman Kara in the Republic of Togo to Raphael Kodzo Atiboly and Mercy Yawa Sampede. In private life she is known as Barbara Peace Atiboly.

Education and Career 
She started her secondary education at Peki Secondary School and completed at the Kpando Technical Institute, after which she began her cross-border trade between Ghana and Togo. After some years of trading, Mama Ametor enrolled in the university to continue her education. She holds a Bachelor of Science in Banking and Finance, a Master of Philosophy in Leadership and a Master of Business Administration from the University of Professional Studies. She is a member of staff of the Ministry of Gender and Social Protection, and the President of the Volta Young Queens Club, a group of queen mothers in the region who work to harmonise development in their traditional areas.

Chieftaincy 
Barbara Peace Atiboly was installed as queen mother of the Alavanyo traditional area on 15th January 2006 at Alavanyo Kpeme, where she was given the title Mama Ametor Hoebuadzu II. From the early days of her chieftaincy till date, she has sought to bridge the gap between tradition and culture on one hand, and contemporary opportunities for social and economic development on the other. She has organised several events and trainings with a view to address the needs of communities in Volta region, especially Alavanyo. Past events and interventions she has organised include entrepreneurship trainings, sourcing and distribution of textbooks, and delivery of hospital beds to some clinics in the Hohoe Municipality. She has also paid keen interest to well-being of women and children.

Developmental works 
She spearheaded the construction of a maternity and child health center in Alavanyo- Dzogbedze to provide health care services to the community, and to help reduce pregnancy related deaths and infant mortality. 

She is one of the several women traditional leaders whose leadership is being studied under a University of Ghana project titled "Women and Political Participation in Africa: A Comparative Study of Representations and Roles of Female Chiefs", which is funded by the Andrew W. Mellon Foundation. In this project, a mixed-methods approach is adopted to comparatively study women’s representation in the institution of chieftaincy and their influence on women’s rights and wellbeing in Botswana, Ghana, Liberia, and South Africa. Lead researchers on the project, Peace A. Medie, Adriana A. E Biney, Amanda Coffie and Cori Wielenga, have also published an opinion piece titled "Women traditional leaders could help make sure the pandemic message is heard" in The Conversation news, which discusses how women traditional leaders can educate their subjects on Covid-19.

References 

Ghanaian royalty
Volta Region
Living people
Year of birth missing (living people)